The National Youth Wind Orchestra of Great Britain (NYWO) consists of around 75 young musicians aged 14 to 21 from England, Scotland and Wales. Members are required to hold a minimum instrument Grade 8 at distinction level and are selected by auditions which take place annually in the autumn at various musical centres across the UK.

History, structure, and leadership 

The National Youth Wind Orchestra of Great Britain (NYWO) was originally named The British Youth Wind Orchestra when founded by clarinettist Eric McGavin in 1968. Stephen Dodgson(Chairman), Andrew McGavin, Robert Montgomery and Leonard Salzedo established it as a charity on 1 January 1986 and registered it with the Charity Commission on 28 February 1986.
Formed as the British Youth Wind Orchestra by Eric McGavin (Musical Director 1968–1970) and Harry Legge (Principal Conductor 1968–1989), it was renamed, National Youth Wind Orchestra of Great Britain (NYWO) in 1986. Almost 5,000 young players have enjoyed music making in the orchestra, progressing to study at the UK's conservatoires and working in orchestras, ensembles and organisations music industry. NYWO's Vice Presidents are Andrew McGavin, Timothy Reynish and Prof. Jonathan Freeman-Attwood. Other Directors have included Kit Shepherd (1990 – 2013).

NYWO has conductor Simon Rattle as its patron.

Performances 

The NYWO has performed at concert venues throughout the country and abroad including St John's, Smith Square, the Royal Albert Hall, Duke's Hall, Cadogan Hall, Birmingham Town Hall, Oxford Town Hall, the Zeughaus in Teufen, Ittingen Charterhouse (Switzerland) and the Rudolfinum in Prague (Czech Republic).

It performed at the Royal Albert Hall Promenade Concert 40 in the 2012 season and the BBC Proms Millennium Day in 2000 which was organised by Kit Shepherd in conjunction with the BBC. NYWO has also been recorded on BBC Radio 3 and Classic FM.

Courses 
During the Easter and summer school holidays, the main orchestra meets for residential courses lasting approximately 9 days each. Tuition is given by professional musicians under the direction of well known international conductors. Tutors have included Paul Harris, Simon de Souza, Neil Crossley, Pete Harrison.

Conductors 

Conductors include Glenn D.Price (Canada), Matthew George (America), James Gourlay (Scotland), Colin Touchin (England) 1969–89, Harry Legge OBE (England), Peter Bassano (England), Tijmen Botma (Netherlands),  (Sweden), Dr. Robert Childs (Wales).

Composition 

NYWO continues to commission new works whenever possible, inviting composers and soloists to work closely with members of the orchestra on new compositions. The orchestra were invited to perform Gavin Higgins's BBC Commission and world premiere, Der Aufstand, to much acclaim for the BBC Promenade Concert 40 in the 2012 season.

Charitable trust 

NYWO is a registered charity no. 327024. Current trustees are Mr Paul Harris, Dr. Ursula Jones OBE, Dr. Robert Childs & Mr. Roger Minty.

This orchestra relies wholly on charitable donations, gifts and sponsorship. Funding is an essential requirement for the orchestra to continue, particularly in assisting young musicians to attend the bi-annual courses and to ensure the continuity of high quality tutors.

Charles Hine is an Education Trust and Council member

See also 

 Children's National Youth Wind Orchestra
 National Youth Wind Ensemble of Great Britain
 National Youth Jazz Orchestra
 List of youth orchestras

References 

NYWO Archives
National Youth Wind Orchestra Published Programmes

Sources 
NYWO Concert Programmes
Repertoire by country on timreynish.com
bedfordschool.org.uk
YouTube
sjss.org.uk
biography on timreynish.com
4barsrest.com

External links 

British youth orchestras